Du Ping (born 28 February 1978) is a Chinese former international footballer who predominantly played for Shenyang Jinde and Shaanxi Baorong Chanba as a midfielder.

Club career
Du started his football career in the 1998 Chinese league season with top tier football club Shenyang Ginde where he would gradually establish himself as talented attacking midfielder. His performances for his club would soon see him called up to the Chinese international team and on February 16, 2003 he would make his debut against  Estonia in a friendly, which saw China win 1-0. By the 2004 Chinese league season, league runners-up Shanghai COSCO Sanlin purchased him for Four million Yuan, however in his debut season a poor run of form and injuries saw him only limited to six league games without scoring. While he would overcome his injuries the following season his performances were not as inspiring as the club were hoping for and the team finished the league in eighth.
 
In 2007, he joined Hong Kong First Division League club South China on loan and made his debut for the team in a First Division League match against Workable as a substitution player on 26 September 2007 where SCAA won by 6-1. On 16 October 2007, it was released on SCAA Official Blog that the contract with Du had been terminated due to his discipline problem. The issue was mainly due to a quarrel between Du and teammate Detinho before a match against Citizen on 13 October 2007. Detinho also received a verbal warning after the incident. After his brief period within Hong Kong, Du would return to China and transferred to second tier club Shenyang Dongjin before joining third tier football team Panjin Mengzun in 2010.

Career statistics

Last updated: 1 Jan 2012

References

External links
 
 Du Ping at HKFA

1978 births
Living people
Footballers from Shenyang
Chinese footballers
Changsha Ginde players
Beijing Renhe F.C. players
South China AA players
Hong Kong First Division League players
Expatriate footballers in Hong Kong
Shenyang Dongjin players
Chinese expatriate sportspeople in Hong Kong
Chinese Super League players
China League One players
Association football midfielders
China international footballers